is the name of an Edo period minka farmhouse in the Iya Valley, western Tokushima, Japan. Dating from around 1720, the house is believed to be the second oldest in Iya. (The oldest, nearby Kimura House, is designated an Important Cultural Property)

Chiiori preserves its original structure, irori 囲炉裏 floor hearths, and pine floors blackened by hundreds of years of smoke from the irori. The house is unusual for farm houses in Japan because there are no ceilings (except over the small sleeping rooms). This was because for much of the Edo period, tobacco was a leading crop of Iya, and villagers used to hang the tobacco up in the rafters to smoke over the irori. Due to the lack of ceilings, Chiiori has a dramatic wide-open interior.

Purchased by Alex Kerr in 1973, Chiiori features in Alex's book Lost Japan. Originally there was no road up to the house, so the only access was to walk an hour from the Iya River road below. Today there's a winding one-lane road access to the house. It is now the center of Chiiori Trust (a non-profit organization based in Iya Valley that is working toward solutions to the problems surrounding depopulation in rural Japan), and Chiiori Alliance (a company dedicated to the same goals).

From 1997 to 2007, Kerr shared ownership of Chiiori with Mason Florence.  However, in summer of 2007, Kerr bought back Florence's share and since then Alex and the Chiiori Trust / Chiiori Alliance have managed the house.

In 2012, Chiiori underwent a major restoration. Over the course of a year, the roof was re-thatched, walls and underfloor structure redone with damage repaired, earthquake protection incorporated, and amenities built in, such as plumbing, bath, toilets, lighting, and heating systems etc. However, most of these changes are invisible, and the thatch, irori, and old pine floors are as they've always been.

Working as a consultant for Miyoshi City, of which Iya is a part, Alex went on to restore eight other thatched houses in the hamlet of Ochiai, further up the valley from Chiiori. Today Chiiori Alliance manages all nine houses as places for people to stay and for cultural events.

External links
 Official website

Architecture in Japan
Houses in Japan
1720s establishments in Japan
Houses completed in 1720
Buildings and structures in Tokushima Prefecture
Thatched buildings